Charles Maung Bo (born 29 October 1948) is a Burmese Catholic prelate who has served as Archbishop of Yangon since 7 June 2003. He was created a cardinal by Pope Francis in 2015.

Early life and education
Bo was born on 29 October 1948, in Monhla Village, Shwebo District, Sagaing Region, Myanmar to parents John and Juliana Aye Tin. Bo's father, a farmer, died when he was 2. Thereafter, he was sent to a Salesian-run boarding school in Mandalay. From 1962 to 1976, Bo studied at the Nazareth Aspirantate, a Salesian seminary, in Anisakan village, near Maymyo (now Pyin Oo Lwin).

Career
Bo was ordained a priest of the Salesians of Don Bosco order on 9 April 1976. He was appointed as prefect of the Roman Catholic Diocese of Lashio in 1986. Four years later, he was consecrated Bishop of Lashio. In 1996, he was transferred to the Diocese of Pathein. On 17 March 2001, Pope John Paul II named him a member of the Pontifical Council for Interreligious Dialogue.

On 24 May 2003, Pope John Paul named Bo Archbishop of Yangon. On 17 January 2009, Pope Benedict XVI named him a member of the Pontifical Council for Culture.

On 4 January 2015, Pope Francis announced that he would make Bo a cardinal on 14 February of the same year. At that ceremony, he was assigned the titular church of Sant’Ireneo a Centocelle

In April 2015 Pope Francis named him a member of the Congregation for Institutes of Consecrated Life and Societies of Apostolic Life and the Pontifical Council for Culture, and in July 2016 a member of the Secretariat for Communications.

In July 2018, Francis named him a delegate to the Synod of Bishops on youth, faith, and vocational discernment.

He was elected to a three-year term as head of the Federation of Asian Bishops' Conferences (FABC) in the fall of 2018.

See also
Cardinals created by Pope Francis

References

External links

 

1948 births
Living people
Burmese Roman Catholics
20th-century Roman Catholic bishops in Myanmar
Salesian cardinals
Cardinals created by Pope Francis
Members of the Congregation for Institutes of Consecrated Life and Societies of Apostolic Life
Members of the Pontifical Council for Culture
Burmese cardinals
People from Sagaing Region